Danga Bay is the largest recreational park in the city of Johor Bahru, Johor, Malaysia. It was developed by Tan Sri Datuk Lim Kang Hoo via Ekovest Berhad and is located near Istana Bukit Serene, about 7 km from Johor Bahru's city centre.

Large projects have been earmarked for this area, including a new financial and commercial hub, hotels, exhibition and convention centre, marina and upmarket residential properties.

Location
Nestled in the south-central part of Iskandar Malaysia, Danga Bay is Johor Bahru's first and largest mixed residential-commercial development.

Residential neighbourhoods
Tropicana Danga Bay
Country Garden Danga Bay

Transportation
Danga Bay can be accessed from Skudai Highway (Federal Route 1) via the Danga Bay interchange which becomes Jalan Skudai Route, which is located near Istana Bukit Serene. Those coming from Johor Bahru city centre can access Danga Bay via Jalan Skudai. It is also accessible by Causeway Link (1B, 5B, 51B) from Johor Bahru Sentral railway station.

See also
 List of tourist attractions in Johor

References

External links

 Johor Bahru Hunts
 Danga bay, Vision city of the South

Amusement parks in Johor
Johor Bahru